Qayamat Se Qayamat Tak, also known by the initialism QSQT, is a 1988 Indian Hindi-language romantic musical film, directed by Mansoor Khan, written and produced by Nasir Hussain, and starring Aamir Khan (in his leading film debut) along with Juhi Chawla in lead roles. The film was released on 29 April 1988 to widespread critical acclaim, and was a major commercial success at the box office, turning Aamir Khan and Juhi Chawla into superstars. 

The plot of the film was a modern-day take on classic tragic romance stories such as Layla and Majnun, Heer Ranjha, and Romeo and Juliet. QSQT, which "reinvented the romantic musical genre" in Bollywood, was a milestone in the history of Hindi cinema, setting the template for Bollywood musical romance films that defined Hindi cinema in the 1990s. The soundtrack of the film, composed by Anand–Milind, with lyrics written by Majrooh Sultanpuri, was equally successful, becoming one of the best-selling Bollywood soundtrack albums of the 1980s with more than 8million soundtrack albums sold, and with "Papa Kehte Hain" (sung by Udit Narayan and picturized on Aamir Khan) being the most popular hit song from the album. The soundtrack was a breakthrough for the careers of Anand–Milind, as well as T-Series, one of India's leading record labels. 

At the 36th National Film Awards, Qayamat Se Qayamat Tak won the National Film Award for Best Popular Film Providing Wholesome Entertainment. At the 34th Filmfare Awards, the film received 11 nominations, and won a leading 8 awards, including Best Film, Best Director (Mansoor), Best Male Debut (Aamir), and Best Female Debut (Chawla). Indiatimes Movies ranks the film amongst the "Top 25 Must See Bollywood Films".

Plot 
Dhanakpur village farmers Thakur Jaswant and Dhanraj Singh are brothers. Their younger sister Madhumati aka Madhu was dumped and impregnated by Ratan, the younger son of Thakur Raghuvir Singh (Arun Mathur) from a rich Rajput family. The family refuses Madhu's marriage to Ratan, who's engaged to another girl, after he denies the allegations made by Jaswant. But his mother later tells Raghuvir she secretly heard Madhu tell Ratan the allegations some time earlier outside their house and begs him to marry them. He immediately refuses telling her an unmarried pregnant girl can't ruin their family's honour by becoming their daughter-in-law. Jaswant leaves the village to sell their farm and see if they can move to Delhi where their other sister Parvati lives with her husband Bhagwandas and son Shyam, when he realizes the huge humiliation and shame their family will get there because Madhu's lover will marry someone else especially after he impregnated her. Saddened by losing her lover and the dishonour he will cause her family, Madhu commits suicide. Frustrated, Dhanraj brings her body at Ratan's wedding and kills him. He is jailed. The two families are now enemies. Jaswant moves to Delhi with Dhanraj's wife Saroj and son, Raj at Parvati's house, runs a clothing business with Bhagwandas and reaches good; he also raises Raj.

14 years later 
Bailed, Dhanraj receives a letter from his son Raj, an ardent music lover who completes his education in Rajput College. He sneaks into Raj's college farewell party and is glad to see him fulfill his dreams. After the party Raj and his cousin Shyam who also completed his education there, emotionally reunite with him and bring him home where he also emotionally reunites with the rest of the family. Raj, Shyam and Dhanraj now join Bhagwandas and Jaswant's business furthering their success. In a twist of fate, Raj goes to Dhanakpur with Shyam to file a business case against Raghuvir's elder son Thakur Randhir Singh. While returning home, he is attracted to Randhir's beautiful daughter Rashmi. He sneaks with a reluctant Shyam into her birthday party that night to see her. He poses as Roop Singh, Randhir's friend Thakur Pratap Singh's son whom he wants her to get married to. Raj reluctantly meets with Randhir after he becomes happy to "see" him after long. When the real Roop Singh arrives, Randhir refuses to believe it and that's when Raj and Shyam flee much to Randhir's anger. He then finds out from his manager, he was Dhanraj's son who came to file a business case against him and tells his mother and Rashmi which shocks them. Raj and Rashmi meet again at a holiday spot and fall in love. Raj learns about her family but is unable to tell her the truth. But after she eats with him, Shyam, Dhanraj and Saroj, she tells Dhanraj she's Thakur Randhir's Singh's daughter and is from Dhanakpur. Frustrated, he tells her he is the one who killed her uncle Ratan. Saddened, she and Raj exchange an emotional goodbye after he also tells her he tried to forget her after learning her identity a long time ago but couldn't because he was madly in love with her which shocks her. Back in Delhi, they still secretly meet even after he reluctantly promises his family he'll forget her when they confront him for loving an enemy. Randhir finds out about them after seeing them together at her college after he overhears their phone call at their house one day, and fixes her wedding to Roop Singh. He warns Jaswant, Saroj and Parvati at their house that he'll kill Raj if he tries to meet her again. Jaswant then confronts Raj about it and agrees to not tell Dhanraj anything after Raj lies he met her only to end their love. After Randhir beats him up and throws him out of their house when he warns him, he and his father can't separate them no matter what, at her engagement, she gets engaged to Roop Singh. Raj becomes very heartbroken about her engagement and cries in his father's arms out of shame for loving their enemy. However, later on with the help of her friend Kavita, she elopes from home and with Shyam's help Raj gets ready to elope too.

Raj and Rashmi take on their families and elope, dreaming of an idyllic life together. They stay in a deserted fort, happy in their own paradise. Furious, Randhir posts Raj's picture in the newspapers offering a huge reward if he is found but doesn't share Rashmi's name thinking of the bad name their family will get. Dhanraj warns him that he'll reluctantly be the killer Dhanraj he was before if he harms Raj after seeing his picture. When Randhir learns their whereabouts, he, his brother-in-law and his nephew Balwant hire killers to kill Raj. Overhearing this, his mother then goes to Raj's house and begs his family to save them. Raj leaves to bring firewood for their house. Randhir arrives with his brother-in-law, Balwant and the killers. They send them to kill Raj. While Raj is away, Randhir meets Rashmi, assuring her he has "accepted their love" and came to take them home.

Rashmi is overjoyed at Randhir's words, unaware of the truth. Raj is chased by the henchmen. Dhanraj reaches the fort with Jaswant, Shyam and Randhir's mother and asks about Raj's whereabouts. Rashmi leaves to make sure Raj is okay. He is about to be shot but the henchman shoots Rashmi twice instead. She dies in Raj's arms, making him devastated and grief-stricken.

Raj commits suicide by stabbing himself, and dies beside Rashmi. The final scene is both families running toward them; the lovers are together, never to be separated, as the sun sets behind them.

Cast 

 Aamir Khan as Rajveer "Raj" Singh
 Imran Khan as young Raj
 Juhi Chawla as Rashmi Singh
 Goga Kapoor as Randhir Singh, Rashmi's father
 Dalip Tahil as Dhanraj Singh, Raj's father
 Ravindra Kapoor as Dharampal Singh
 Asha Sharma as Saraswati Singh
 Alok Nath as Jaswant Singh, Raj's paternal uncle
 Rajendranath Zutshi as Shyam Prakash
 Shehnaz Kudia as Kavita Bhalotiya
 Charushila as Parvati Sharma
 Beena Banerjee as Saroj Kunder
 Reema Lagoo as Kamla Singh, Rashmi's mother
 Nandita Thakur as Indumati Devi
 Ahmed Khan as Bhagwandas Kumar
 Arjun as Ratan Singh, Madhumati's ex-lover
 Ajit Vachani as Vakil Biharilal
 Yunus Parvez as Truck Driver
 Viju Khote as Maan Singh
 Arun Mathur as Raghuvir Singh, Ratan's father
 Shehzad Khan as Shahid Khan
 Makrand Deshpande as Baba
Yatin Karyekar as Baba's friend
Faisal Khan as Baba's friend
 Shiva Rindani as Balwant Singh
 Reena Dutta in a Special Appearance in Song "Papa Kehte Hain"

Production 
The film marked the directorial debut of Mansoor Khan, son of Nasir Hussain as well as the acting debut of Mansoor's cousin Aamir Khan. The film was a tale of unrequited love and parental opposition, with Khan portraying Raj, a "clean-cut, wholesome boy-next-door". The plot was a modern-day take on classic tragic romance stories such as Layla-Majnun, Heer-Ranjha, and Romeo-Juliet.

Mansoor recalled that his father Nasir wanted to launch Aamir as a leading actor and got convinced that Mansoor would direct the film after watching his telefilm. The film was initially titled Nafrat Ke Waaris before returning to original title.

Nasir initially wanted to cast Shammi Kapoor and Sanjeev Kumar as the family patriarchs, but Mansoor refused to work with them as they were 'too senior.'

For the film's marketing, Aamir was involved in promoting the film. He set up an outdoor ad campaign, which was a faceless poster that said, "Who is Aamir Khan? Ask the girl next door!" With the help of his brother-in-law Raj Zutshi, Khan also went around putting up posters on auto-rickshaws across Mumbai.

Music 

The soundtrack contains five songs composed by duo Anand–Milind, and songs written by veteran Majrooh Sultanpuri. All the tracks were sung by Udit Narayan, who sang for Aamir Khan and Alka Yagnik, who sang for Juhi Chawla.

Pancham (R. D. Burman) was to compose the soundtrack, but director Mansoor Khan wanted a young music director. That's how Anand–Milind, who had worked with him earlier on this tele-film, secured this project. Mansoor selected Narayan to sing all songs because he felt that his voice would suit Aamir.

The biggest hit song from the album was "Papa Kehte Hain". Majroosh saab (as he is fondly known) wrote the song at the age of 70. Sung by Narayan and picturised on Aamir Khan, the full title of the song is "Papa Kehte Hain Bada Naam Karega", which translates to "My dad says that I'll make him proud!".

Qayamat Se Qayamat Tak was the best-selling Bollywood music soundtrack album of 1988, outselling Tezaab, the second best-seller, which itself had sold over 8million units. Qayamat Se Qayamat Tak became one of the best-selling Indian soundtrack albums of the 1980s. It was the first major hit album released by the record label T-Series. Prior to release, Nasir Hussain reportedly sold the film's music rights to T-Series founder Gulshan Kumar for only .

At the 34th Filmfare Awards, Anand–Milind won the Filmfare Award for Best Music Director, Majrooh Sultanpuri was nominated for Best Lyricist for "Papa Kehte Hain", and Udit Narayan won Best Male Playback Singer for "Papa Kehte Hain".

Popular culture 
The song "Papa Kehte Hain":

 was used in Hum Saath Saath Hain (1999) in a parody. It was rendered by the original singer Udit Narayan and re-written by Ravinder Rawal.
 was used in Dil (also starring Aamir Khan) (1990) during a college party scene.
 was used in Andaz Apna Apna (also starring Aamir Khan) (1994) in a comedy sequence.
 was recreated by Vishal–Shekhar as a short song for the 2012 film Student of the Year, which was Varun Dhawan's debut, in which he sings while performing at a concert.
 was used in the Ajay Devgn-starrer, De De Pyaar De (2019) everytime Bhavin Bhanushali's character, Ishaan talks lovingly about Ayesha (played by Rakul Preet Singh), without knowing that she is his father's girlfriend (played by Devgn).

The song was also a success in the Binaca Geetmala.

The song "Aye Mere Humsafar" was recreated by Mithoon and sung by Mithoon and Tulsi Kumar for the 2015 film All Is Well. Amitabh Verma wrote additional lyrics for this version.

The song "Ghazab Ka Hai Din" was used in 2015 film Masaan.

The song "Ghazab Ka Hai Din" was also recreated by Tanishk Bagchi and sung by Jubin Nautiyal & Prakriti Kakar for the 2018 film Dil Juunglee. Tanishk Bagchi wrote additional lyrics for this version.

Box office 
Qayamat Se Qayamat Tak became a golden jubilee hit after running for 50 weeks.

The film was also released in China, in 1990. It was Aamir Khan's first film released in China, two decades before he became a household name there in the 2010s after 3 Idiots (2009).

Accolades

Remakes 
The film was remade in Telugu as Akkada Ammayi Ikkada Abbayi, which marked the debut for Pawan Kalyan. It was also remade in Bangladesh as Keyamat Theke Keyamat in 1993, marking it as the debut film for Bangladeshi superstar Salman Shah and Moushumi. It was also remade in Sinhala as Dalu lana gini  starring Damith Fonseka and Dilhani Ekanayake. It was also remade in Nepali as Yug dekhi yug samma, which marked the debut of Nepalese superstar Rajesh Hamal.

Legacy 
Qayamat Se Qayamat Tak proved to be a major commercial success, catapulting both Khan and Chawla to superstardom. It received 8 Filmfare Awards including a Best Male Debut for Khan and Best Female Debut award for Chawla.
 The film has since attained cult status. Bollywood Hungama credits it as a "path-breaking and trend-setting film" for Indian cinema.

Gautam Chintamani's book Qayamat Se Qayamat Tak: The Film That Revived Hindi Cinema (2016) credits the film with revitalizing Hindi cinema. In the late 1980s, Hindi cinema was experiencing a decline in box office turnout, due to increasing violence, decline in musical melodic quality, and rise in video piracy, leading to middle-class family audiences abandoning theaters. Qayamat Se Qayamat Taks blend of youthfulness, wholesome entertainment, emotional quotients and strong melodies is credited with luring family audiences back to the big screen. The film is credited with having "reinvented the romantic musical genre" in Bollywood. Chintamani credits it as one of the most important films of the last three decades. It was a milestone in the history of Hindi cinema, setting the template for Bollywood musical romance films that defined Hindi cinema in the 1990s. In a 2000 survey by Indolink.com, Qayamat Se Qayamat Tak was ranked the best film of the 80's.

Notes

References

External links 
 

1988 films
1980s Hindi-language films
1980s romantic musical films
1988 romantic drama films
Films scored by Anand–Milind
Indian romantic musical films
Indian romantic drama films
Films based on Indian folklore
Films based on Romeo and Juliet
Films shot in Delhi
Films set in Delhi
Best Popular Film Providing Wholesome Entertainment National Film Award winners
1988 directorial debut films